Tulsa-Sapulpa Union Railway Company, L.L.C.  is a Class III shortline rail carrier which operates freight service between Tulsa, Oklahoma and Sapulpa, Oklahoma over 10 miles of track known as the Sapulpa Lead, as well as leases and operates a 12.9 mile section of Union Pacific track known as the Jenks Industrial Lead between Tulsa and Jenks, Oklahoma.  The line connects with two Class I railroads, being the Union Pacific at Tulsa and the BNSF at Sapulpa, and additionally connects to its fellow Class III shortline, the Sand Springs Railway, in Tulsa.  It is owned by the Collins Family Trust.  Major customers on the Sapulpa Lead include Technotherm, Prescor, and Ardagh Glass, and on the Jenks Industrial Lead, the Sinclair Oil Refinery, Kentube, Word Industries, Pepsi Cola, and Kimberly-Clark.

History
The company started in 1907 as the Sapulpa & Interurban Railway, running electric trolley cars to carry workers between Sapulpa and various plants along the Arkansas River.  In 1908 it opened a route connecting Sapulpa to the towns of Kiefer, Glenpool, and Mounds in Oklahoma, to transport oil field workers to the Glenn Pool and Sapulpa-area oil fields.   Running through sparsely-populated areas and carrying little freight, the line was bankrupt by 1912, but merged with another interurban line, the Oklahoma Union Railway, in an attempt to help both.   Oklahoma Union served Tulsa and communities to the southwest, and had unsuccessfully tried to reach Sapulpa.  After a second bankruptcy in 1917, the combined company was again reorganized as the Sapulpa Electric Interurban Railway, and in 1918 completed the connection between Sapulpa and Tulsa, giving it a total route of 25 miles of track.  The Sapulpa-Mounds line was abandoned in 1928, and the company went bankrupt again in 1929.  In 1933, passenger service ended in favor of freight, and by 1934 or 1935 George Collins bought the line to service his glass plant in Sapulpa.  His line was incorporated as the Sapulpa Union Railway, with the name later changing to the Tulsa-Sapulpa Union Railway around 1943.

Operations
The railroad converted from electric to diesel operation in the 1959-1960 timeframe with the purchase of Electro-Motive diesel switchers such as SW1s and SW7s.

About 60% of rail traffic is inbound to customers on the line, while 40% of rail traffic is outbound.

The railway operates 5 days a week, through two locomotives with one shift each, utilizing five employees.  Its offices are in Sapulpa, where a preserved interurban trolley, the Maggie M, is on display.

The current lease agreement with Union Pacific on the Jenks Industrial Lead was signed December 21, 2018 for an initial five-year term, which may be extended by TSU for an additional 15 years.

References

Oklahoma railroads
Interurban railways in Oklahoma
1907 establishments in Oklahoma